Cymatura bizonata is a species of beetle in the family Cerambycidae. It was described by Quedenfeldt in 1881. It is known from the Republic of the Congo, Tanzania, Angola, the Democratic Republic of the Congo, and Equatorial Guinea. It feeds on Acacia decurrens.

References

Xylorhizini
Beetles described in 1881